Lottie is a file format for vector graphics animation, and is named after Charlotte "Lotte" Reiniger, a German pioneer of silhouette animation.

Description
Lottie is based in JSON but Lottie files use keys of 1–2 characters in length and are not readable by humans.
It is intended as a lighter alternative to animated GIFs and APNG files for use in the web and mobile and desktop applications.
Being vectorial it is independent of the device resolution.
It can also include raster graphic elements.
It allows to be programmed and interactive.

The different player implementations have tradeoffs between CPU, GPU and memory usage.

History
2015 -  Hernan Torrisi released a plugin named Bodymovin for the animation software Adobe After Effects that serialized animations as JSON to be rendered at runtime.
It supports some but not all of the features of the internal format of After Effects.
Additionally, Torrisi released the a renderer for the format with a  JavaScript based player for modern browsers.  

2017 - it was the work of engineers Brandon Withrow (iOS), Gabriel Peal (Android), and Leland Richardson (React Native) along with lead animator Salih Abdul-Karim at AirBnB  that saw the creation of the first Lottie libraries to render the animations in different platforms.

Other companies have provided support for more platforms.

2018 - Microsoft and the .NET Foundation released a library for rendering Lottie on Windows.

2019 - further support for Lottie was by Qt with the release of a QML API for rendering Lottie. Later that same year, Samsung released rLottie which is a platform independent C++-based renderer for Lottie, and added Lottie support in Tizen. A Python framework to work with the format was also released this year.

2020 - dotLottie was created. This open-source file format combines multiple Lottie files and all their supporting resources into a single file.

Example

This code will produce the circle shown in the image:
{
    "v": "5.7.1",
    "ip": 0,
    "op": 180,
    "nm": "Animation",
    "fr": 60,
    "w": 512,
    "h": 512,
    "layers": [
        {
            "ddd": 0,
            "ty": 4,
            "ind": 0,
            "st": 0,
            "ip": 0,
            "op": 180,
            "nm": "Layer",
            "ks": {
                "a": {
                    "a": 0,
                    "k": [
                        256,
                        256
                    ]
                },
                "p": {
                    "a": 0,
                    "k": [
                        256,
                        256
                    ]
                },
                "s": {
                    "a": 0,
                    "k": [
                        100,
                        100
                    ]
                },
                "r": {
                    "a": 0,
                    "k": 0
                },
                "o": {
                    "a": 0,
                    "k": 100
                }
            },
            "shapes": [
                {
                    "ty": "el",
                    "nm": "Ellipse",
                    "d": 1,
                    "p": {
                        "a": 0,
                        "k": [
                            256,
                            256
                        ]
                    },
                    "s": {
                        "a": 0,
                        "k": [
                            256,
                            256
                        ]
                    }
                },
                {
                    "ty": "st",
                    "nm": "Stroke",
                    "o": {
                        "a": 0,
                        "k": 100
                    },
                    "c": {
                        "a": 0,
                        "k": [
                            0.114,
                            0.157,
                            0.282
                        ]
                    },
                    "lc": 2,
                    "lj": 2,
                    "ml": 0,
                    "w": {
                        "a": 0,
                        "k": 20
                    }
                },
                {
                    "ty": "fl",
                    "nm": "Fill",
                    "o": {
                        "a": 0,
                        "k": 100
                    },
                    "c": {
                        "a": 0,
                        "k": [
                            0.196,
                            0.314,
                            0.690
                        ]
                    },
                    "r": 1
                }
            ]
        }
    ]
}

The dotLottie file format

In 2020, the dotLottie file format was proposed as a standard way to pack Lottie files with other resources.
The file is actually a zip file compressed with the deflate method.
It includes a manifest file and preview images to ease the manipulation of the files.

References

External links
  by the Lottie animation communities
 A Human's guide to the Lottie format Extensive documentation of the format

Computer-related introductions in 2015
2D animation software
Vector graphics file formats
Adobe software
JSON